Haddada is a town and rural commune located just southeast of Kenitra, in the Rabat-Salé-Kénitra region, Morocco. At the time of the 2004 census, the commune had a total population of 11,856 people living in 1728 households.

References

Populated places in Kénitra Province
Rural communes of Rabat-Salé-Kénitra